McAlester Christian Academy is a private Christian school located in McAlester, Oklahoma, United States. Founded in 2006, the school offers a Christian college preparatory program to students in kindergarten through 12th grade.

History
Planning got underway in 2005 for a private school affiliated with the Main and Oklahoma Church of Christ. The school planned to follow the A Beka curriculum on DVDs. On August 16, 2006, McAlester Christian Academy opened its doors to 27 students. It began with a faculty of six people. By the end of the school year its enrollment was at 33 students.

The school had 43 students in its second year of operation with eight faculty, and in 2008 enrollment was 50 students, with five graduating seniors in the second graduating class. In August 2009, the school opened its doors for its fourth year. The enrollment was estimated fifty students ages 2–18, including seven senior students.

Curriculum
McAlester Christian Academy follows the A Beka curriculum throughout the school. For the first two years, the academy used the A Beka DVD program. Now the whole school is teacher-taught but still uses the A Beka curriculum. Grade 11 and 12 students that obtain high scores on the ACT take concurrent enrollment at Eastern Oklahoma State College, at either their McAlester campus or their Wilburton campus. Upon leaving McAlester Christian, the average ACT score is 23 out of 36.

Grading system
McAlester Christian Academy has a four-point grading system, and follows the five-point grading system for honors courses.

Extracurricular activities
The school fields teams in basketball, soccer, cheerleading, and track. The cheerleading squad has won the state competition three times. They received a bid to FCC Nationals in Orlando Florida and placed first at the Oklahoma Christian Schools Athletic Association State Cheerleading Competition in November 2008. The soccer team had its first season in fall of 2008.

References

External links
McAlester Christian Academy

Educational institutions established in 2006
Private high schools in Oklahoma
Schools in Pittsburg County, Oklahoma
Private middle schools in Oklahoma
Private elementary schools in Oklahoma
2006 establishments in Oklahoma